Żuraw may refer to:

Places
Żuraw, Łódź Voivodeship, a village in Sieradz County, Łódź Voivodeship, Poland
Żuraw, Silesian Voivodeship, a village in Częstochowa County, Silesian Voivodeship, Poland

People with the surname
Dariusz Żuraw (born 1972), Polish footballer and manager

Polish-language surnames
Surnames from nicknames